Yeldos Ikhsangaliyev (born 8 July 1978) is a Kazakh judoka. He won a bronze medal in the Men's +100 kg Category at the 2006 Asian Games.  He won a silver medal at the 2004 Asian Judo Championships and bronze medals at the 2001, 2003, 2004, and 2005 Asian Judo Championships.

References 

1978 births
Living people
Judoka at the 2004 Summer Olympics
Judoka at the 2008 Summer Olympics
Olympic judoka of Kazakhstan
Kazakhstani male judoka
Place of birth missing (living people)
Asian Games medalists in judo
Judoka at the 2002 Asian Games
Judoka at the 2006 Asian Games
Asian Games bronze medalists for Kazakhstan
Medalists at the 2006 Asian Games
20th-century Kazakhstani people
21st-century Kazakhstani people